Yang Wenqin (born April 30, 1960 in Shanghai) is a retired Chinese high jumper.

In 1983 she reached the final of the 1983 World Championships in Athletics, but finished 16th and third to last with only 1.84 metres. 

On the regional level she took a gold medal at the Asian Championships in 1985; in addition she won bronze medals at the 1978 and 1982 Asian Games. Both contests were won by fellow Chinese person Zheng Dazhen.

External links

1960 births
Living people
Athletes (track and field) at the 1984 Summer Olympics
Chinese female high jumpers
Olympic athletes of China
Athletes from Shanghai
Asian Games medalists in athletics (track and field)
Athletes (track and field) at the 1978 Asian Games
Athletes (track and field) at the 1982 Asian Games
Asian Games bronze medalists for China
Medalists at the 1978 Asian Games
Medalists at the 1982 Asian Games